Sud Menucci (January 20, 1892 — July 22, 1948) was a Brazilian journalist and educator, who was a strong proponent of quality in public education in his country. The municipality of Sud Mennucci, São Paulo has been named in his honor.

Mennucci was born in Piracicaba, state of São Paulo. In 1910 he started his career as a teacher in a rural school. In 1913 he moved to Belém, in the state of Pará, invited to reorganize the Escolas de Aprendizes de Marinheiros de Belém do Pará until 1914. Back to São Paulo, he continued to work as a teacher in the cities of Porto Ferreira and São Paulo City.

In 1920, he was the coordinator of the school census of the state, which led the reorganization of the state secretary of education into 15 regional offices. Briefly after that, he was appointed as the director of the regional office of Campinas.

Mennucci's career as a journalist started in 1925. Until 1931, he worked as an editor and literary critic at the O Estado de S. Paulo newspaper. In that year, he was promoted to the general directorship of the state secretary of education of the state of São Paulo. He was also very active, beginning 1930, in the creation of the Centro do Professorado Paulista, one of the main teacher's associations in the state. He was its president between 1931 and 1948.

He was the author of A Crise Brasileira da Educação (The Brazilian Educational Crisis), which received an award by the Academia Brasileira de Educação (Brazilian Academy of Education).  He died in São Paulo, aged 56.

External links
 Biography of Sud Mennucci (In Portuguese)

Menucci
Menucci
Menucci
People from Piracicaba
1892 births
1948 deaths
20th-century journalists

ro:Sud Mennucci